Solute carrier family 30 member 10 is a protein that in humans is encoded by the SLC30A10 gene.

Function

This gene is highly expressed in the liver and is inducible by manganese. Its protein product appears to be critical in maintaining manganese levels, and has higher specificity for manganese than zinc. Loss of function mutations appear to result in a pleomorphic phenotype, including dystonia and adult-onset parkinsonism. Alternatively spliced transcript variants have been observed for this gene. [provided by RefSeq, Mar 2012].

References

Further reading 

. Zeglam A, Abugrara A, Kabuka M. Autosomal-recessive iron deficiency anemia, dystonia and hypermanganesemia caused by new variant mutation of the manganese transporter gene SLC39A14. Acta Neurol Belg. 2019 Sep;119(3):379-384. doi: 10.1007/s13760-018-1024-7. Epub 2018 Sep 19. PMID 30232769.